SFC is the Central Association of the Swedish Associations of Peace. It is part of the Conservative Laestadianism movement. It has five Associations of Peace in Sweden and one in Norway. It has sister organizations in Finland, Estonia, and North America.

Associations
Borås fridsförening
Mälardalens fridsförening
Norrbottens fridsförening
Dalarnas fridsförening
Stockholms fridsförening
Oslos fridsförening (in Norway)

See also
Laestadianism
Laestadianism in America
Association of Peace
SRK, Central Association of the Finnish Associations of Peace
Estonian Lutheran Association of Peace
Laestadian Lutheran Church

Lutheran organizations
Laestadianism
Lutheranism in Sweden